Koughan Memorial Water Tower Park is a park with a water tower in Round Rock, Texas, United States.

History
The water tower was built in 1935 as a Works Progress Administration project.

It was renamed after William Koughan, a CPA who had lived on Round Rock Ave, just up the street from the patch of land containing the water tower. After his death in 1998, his widow, Ruth, and some friends raised $40,000 to spruce up the land, which was also across the street from Bill's CPA practice, and turn it into a park bearing his name.

In 2018, the park was the site of a "pop-up event" hosted by Beto O'Rourke.

References

External links

 
 Water Tower Park at Round Rock Convention and Visitors Bureau

Parks in Texas
Round Rock, Texas
Water towers in the United States